Pornpan Hoemhuk (born 3 June 1993) is a Thai sprinter specialising in the 400 metres. She has won several medals at regional level.

Her personal best in the event is 55.42 seconds set in Schifflange in 2014.

International competitions

References

1993 births
Living people
Pornpan Hoemhuk
Athletes (track and field) at the 2014 Asian Games
Southeast Asian Games medalists in athletics
Pornpan Hoemhuk
Pornpan Hoemhuk
Competitors at the 2011 Southeast Asian Games
Competitors at the 2013 Southeast Asian Games
Competitors at the 2015 Southeast Asian Games
Competitors at the 2017 Southeast Asian Games
Pornpan Hoemhuk
Competitors at the 2015 Summer Universiade
Competitors at the 2017 Summer Universiade
Pornpan Hoemhuk